Shigetsugu is a masculine Japanese given name. Notable people with the name include:

, Japanese samurai
Yonekura Shigetsugu (died 1575), Japanese samurai

Japanese masculine given names